Sir James David Bevan KCMG (born 13 July 1959) is the Chief Executive of the Environment Agency and a former British diplomat.

Early life
Bevan was born on 13 July 1959. He was educated at the Royal Grammar School, High Wycombe and Sussex University.

Career
He joined the British Diplomatic Service in 1982 and served in Kinshasa, Brussels, Paris, and Washington, as well as various posts in the Foreign and Commonwealth Office. He was a visiting fellow at the Weatherhead Center for International Affairs at Harvard (2006–07) and the Chief Operating Officer of the FCO (2007–11). He was the UK's High Commissioner to India from 2011-15.

Bevan became Chief Executive of the Environment Agency in 2015. The Environment Agency's stated aims include confronting climate change, promoting sustainable growth, enhancing the nation's resilience to flooding and drought, and protecting the environment. He has been outspoken on the need to tackle the climate emergency and its consequences, and on the benefits for business and wider society of doing so successfully.

In a speech in 2020, Bevan called for reforms to inherited EU law, including reform of the Water Framework Directive, arguing that its standards were overly strict and did not reflect the actual quality of waterways. Environmental advocates were angered by the proposed reforms, arguing they represented an unacceptable relaxing of standards needed to ensure clean waterways in the country.

He said in 2021 during the annual conference of the Association of British Insurers that extreme flooding in UK indicates urgent need for change if humanity is to survive.

Personal life
Sir James is married with three daughters.

Honours
Bevan was appointed CMG in 2006 and knighted KCMG in 2012.

References

1959 births
Living people
Alumni of the University of Sussex
People educated at the Royal Grammar School, High Wycombe
High Commissioners of the United Kingdom to India
Knights Commander of the Order of St Michael and St George